The 2015 Vietnamese National U17 Football Championship is the 12th edition of the Vietnamese National U17 Football Championship, the annual youth football tournament organised by the Vietnam Football Federation (VFF) for male players under-17

Qualification

Qualified teams

Venue 
Two football stadiums were hosted matches of the football competition:

Group stage

Group A

Group B

Knockout stage

Semi-finals

Final

References 

2015 in Vietnamese football
Youth football in Vietnam
2015 in youth association football